Let's Stick Together is a 1952 animated short film featuring Donald Duck.  It was released by Walt Disney Productions.

Plot
Two old friends, Donald Duck and Spike hang out in a park and look back on their long friendship. They reminisce about picking up trash together, being tattoo artists, and then doing embroidery. Eventually Spike asks for time off and Donald presents him with a custom-built greenhouse full of flowers. Unfortunately is also contains a lady bee, which causes some jealousy from Donald.

Voice cast
Clarence Nash as Donald Duck
Bill Thompson as Spike
June Foray as Spike's wife

Home media
The short was released on November 11, 2008 on Walt Disney Treasures: The Chronological Donald, Volume Four: 1951-1961.

References

External links
 
 

1952 films
1952 animated films
1950s Disney animated short films
Donald Duck short films
Films produced by Walt Disney
1950s English-language films
1950s American films
Films scored by Oliver Wallace